Moss Kent (April 3, 1766 – May 30, 1838) was a United States Representative from New York. Born in Kent's Parish, part of Croton-on-Hudson, New York, he completed preparatory studies, studied law, was admitted to the bar, and practiced there. He moved to Cooperstown, New York, and was a member of the New York State Senate from 1799 to 1803 and the New York State Assembly in 1807 and 1810.

He moved to Champion, and was appointed judge of Jefferson County on February 26, 1810. In 1812, he was elected to Congress as a Federalist.  He was reelected in 1814, and served in the 13th and 14th Congresses (March 4, 1813 – March 3, 1817) as the representative of the newly created 18th District.

He pursued the daughter of friend and business associate William Cooper, Hannah Cooper. She died at age 23, and Kent never married.

After leaving Congress he resumed the practice of law, and later moved to Plattsburgh. He died in Plattsburgh on May 30, 1838, and was interred in Plattsburgh's Riverside Cemetery.

His father was Moss Kent, Sr., a New York lawyer and judge.  His brother was James Kent, another prominent jurist and legal scholar.

1766 births
1838 deaths
New York (state) state court judges
New York (state) state senators
Members of the New York State Assembly
Federalist Party members of the United States House of Representatives from New York (state)
People from Croton-on-Hudson, New York
People from Cooperstown, New York
People from Champion, New York
Politicians from Plattsburgh, New York
Burials in New York (state)